Warren Milton "Butch" Williams (born September 11, 1952 in Duluth, Minnesota) is a retired professional ice hockey player who played 108 games in the National Hockey League in 1974–76. He played for the California Golden Seals and St. Louis Blues and also represented the United States in the 1976 Canada Cup. Williams finished his major league career in 1977 with the Edmonton Oilers of the World Hockey Association and also played for Team USA at the 1977 Ice Hockey World Championship.

He and older brother Tom Williams were the first American brothers to play in the NHL.

From 2010–2013, over the course of three seasons, Butch was the owner and general manager of the Duluth Clydesdales, a Junior A hockey club playing in the Superior International Junior Hockey League.

Career statistics

Regular season and playoffs

International

External links

1952 births
Living people
American men's ice hockey right wingers
California Golden Seals players
Clinton Comets players
Denver Spurs players
Denver Spurs (WHL) players
Edmonton Oilers (WHA) players
Ice hockey people from Duluth, Minnesota
Niagara Falls Flyers (1960–1972) players
Oshawa Generals players
Rhode Island Reds players
Salt Lake Golden Eagles (CHL) players
St. Louis Blues players
Undrafted National Hockey League players